Jesse Penny House and Outbuildings is a historic home and farm complex located near Raleigh, Wake County, North Carolina.  The Penny House was built in 1890, and enlarged in 1900. It is a two-story, single pile, frame I-house with a one-story rear addition.  It features a hip-roofed wraparound porch.  Also on the property are the contributing well house (c. 1900), barn/garage (c. 1900), barn (c. 1900), chicken house (c. 1900), and picket fence (c. 1900).

It was listed on the National Register of Historic Places in 2002.

References

Houses on the National Register of Historic Places in North Carolina
Houses completed in 1900
Houses in Wake County, North Carolina
National Register of Historic Places in Wake County, North Carolina